Munapirtti (mo:gen-) is a village on the island of Munapirtti in the municipality of Pyhtää, Finland.

External links
the webpages of the island of Mogenpört, in Swedish and Finnish

Pyhtää
Villages in Finland